The 2020 Atlanta United 2 season is the team's third year of existence, their third season in the USL which is now rebranded as the USL Championship, the second tier of the American soccer pyramid.

Players

As of September 24, 2020.
The squad of Atlanta United 2 will be composed of an unrestricted number of first-team players on loan to the reserve team, players signed to ATLUTD2, and Atlanta United Academy players. Academy players who appear in matches with ATLUTD2 will retain their college eligibility.

Player movement

In

Out

Academy Leaves

Competitions

Exhibitions

USL Championship

Standings — Group H

Results summary

Results by matchday

Matches

Statistics

Top scorers

Appearances and goals
 
Numbers after plus-sign(+) denote appearances as a substitute.

|-
! colspan=10 style=background:#dcdcdc; text-align:center|Players who have played for Atlanta United 2 this season but have left the club:

|-
|}

References

Atlanta United 2 seasons
Atlanta United 2
Atlanta
Atlanta United 2